Orionides is a clade of tetanuran theropod dinosaurs from the Middle Jurassic to the Present. The clade includes most theropod dinosaurs, including birds.

Relationships
Although many phylogenetic analyses found basal tetanurans that were outside both Megalosauroidea and Avetheropoda, the core dichotomy was named only in 2012. Carrano, Benson and Sampson (2012) named that clade Orionides, and defined it as the node comprising Megalosauroidea, Avetheropoda, their most recent common ancestor, and all its descendants. In 2015, Hendrickx, Hartman and Mateus clarified this definition, specifying it as the least inclusive clade including Allosaurus fragilis, Megalosaurus bucklandii, and Passer domesticus. The cladogram presented below follows a phylogenetic analysis published by Zanno and Makovicky in 2013. 

In 2019, a basal Allosauroid by the name of Asfaltovenator was discovered that provided more evidence to the idea of a monophyletic Carnosauria that contained both Megalosauroid and Allosauroid groups. While this did cast doubt on the validity of Avetheropoda, Orionides as group was still maintained however this could also imply that the name Orionides is synonymous with Avetheropoda.

Range
Large, predatory spinosaurids and allosaurids flourished during the Late Jurassic and Early Cretaceous, especially in Gondwana, but seem to have died out before the end of the Cretaceous, possibly due to competition from abelisaurid ceratosaurs and tyrannosaurid coelurosaurs. The diverse coelurosaurs persisted until the end of the Mesozoic Era, when all except for crown clade avians died out. Modern birds are the only living representatives of the clade Tetanurae.

Etymology
The clade name "Orionides" was first established by Matthew T. Carrano, Roger B. J. Benson and Scott D. Sampson in 2012. It is derived from Orion, the giant hunter of Greek mythology in references to the large size and carnivorism of basal orionidans. The name also refers to the alternative name for the constellation of Orion, Alektropodion, meaning "rooster foot".

References

Tetanurans
Toarcian first appearances
Taxa named by Scott D. Sampson